John Nangle may refer to:
 John Francis Nangle, American judge
 John Nangle, 16th Baron of Navan, Irish nobleman